Hippotion batschii is a moth of the family Sphingidae. It is known from Madagascar.

It is very similar to Hippotion saclavorum, but distinguishable by the darker reddish-brown colour of the upperside of the body and forewings. Only the fifth postmedian line is distinct and conspicuous on the forewing upperside.

References

 Pinhey, E. (1962): Hawk Moths of Central and Southern Africa. Longmans Southern Africa, Cape Town.

Hippotion
Moths described in 1870
Moths of Madagascar
Moths of Africa